Rothia is a genus of flowering plants in the family Fabaceae. It belongs to the tribe Crotalarieae of subfamily Faboideae, and comprises two species:
Rothia indica (L.) Druce
 subsp. australis A.E.Holland
 subsp. indica (L.) Druce
Rothia hirsuta (Guill. & Perr.) Baker

References

Crotalarieae
Fabaceae genera